This is an incomplete list of Filipino full-length films, both mainstream and independently produced, released in theaters and cinemas in 2014.

Top ten grossing films

Note

  Box Office Mojo, a reliable third party box office revenue tracker, does not track any revenues earned during any Metro Manila Film Festival editions. So the official figures by film entries during the festival are only estimates taken from any recent updates from credible and reliable sources such as a film's production outfit, or from any news agencies. Also, Metro Manila Development Authority (MMDA) did not release the official gross sales of each of the films. To verify the figures, see individual sources for the references.

Color key

Films

January–March

April–June

July–September
Color key

Note

  1st Ko si 3rd was also a QCinema International Film Festival entry film.

October–December
Color key

Awards

Local
The following first list shows the Best Picture winners at the four major film awards: FAMAS Awards, Gawad Urian Awards, Luna Awards and Star Awards; and at the three major film festivals: Metro Manila Film Festival, Cinemalaya and Cinema One Originals. The second list shows films with the most awards won from the three major film awards and a breakdown of their total number of awards per award ceremony.

International
The following list shows Filipino films (released in 2014) which were nominated or won awards at international industry-based awards and FIAPF-accredited competitive film festivals.

See also
 2014 in the Philippines
 List of 2014 box office number-one films in the Philippines

References

Philippines